Manoj Kadampoothramadom Jayan also known as Manoj K.Jayan is an Indian actor of Malayalam and Tamil films. He has also done a few Telugu and Kannada films and has also acted in a Bollywood film. Manoj has won three Kerala State Film Award for Second Best Actor for his portrayal of Hariharan's "Kuttan Thampuran" in Sargam (1992), "Thalakkal Chandu" in Pazhassi Raja (2009) and "Kunjiraman" in Farook Abdul Rahiman's Kaliyachan. He has played "Kuttan Thampuran" (Sargam), "Thirumangalath Neelakandan Namboothiri" (Perumthachan), "Kunjunni Namboothiri" (Parinayam), "Unnikrishnan" (Venkalam), "Ananthakrishna Warrier" (Sopanam), "Digambaran" (Anandabhadram) and "Thalakkal Chandu" (Pazhassi Raja). He is the son of singer Jayan of Jaya-Vijaya combo. He is also a singer.

Early life and career
He was born on 15 March 1966, in Kottayam District, Kerala to the famous Carnatic musician and Padma Shri awardee K. G. Jayan and V. K. Sarojini, a teacher. He has an elder brother Biju K Jayan (musician). He had his primary education from St. Joseph Convent UPS Kottayam and Sacred Heart Mount High School and pre-university degree from Government College, Kottayam (Nattakam). Then he joined Southern Film Institute, Trivandrum to learn acting but discontinued later.

Personal life
Manoj married film actress Urvashi on 2 May 2000, which ended in divorce in 2008. They have a daughter Tejalakshmi, born in 2001. Later, he married Asha on 2 March 2011, and they have a son Amrit, born on 30 December 2012.

Filmography

Malayalam

Tamil

Telugu

Kannada

Hindi

Television

Awards

Other awards
2020 - Abraham Lincoln Paramount Literary Award by The International Peace Council United States for his contributions towards cinema, cultural and social works.

Playback singer

References

External links

Male actors from Kottayam
Male actors from Kochi
Living people
Kerala State Film Award winners
Male actors in Malayalam cinema
Indian male film actors
Filmfare Awards South winners
1966 births
20th-century Indian male actors
21st-century Indian male actors
Malayalam playback singers
Indian male playback singers
Singers from Kochi
Indian male television actors
Male actors in Hindi cinema
Male actors in Kannada cinema
Male actors in Telugu cinema